United Nations Security Council Resolution 205, adopted on May 22, 1965, in the face of a potentially widening conflict in the Dominican Republic, the Council requested that the temporary suspension of hostilities in Santo Domingo called for in United Nations Security Council Resolution 203 be transformed into a permanent cease-fire and invited the Secretary-General to submit a report to the Council on the implementation of this resolution.

The resolution was adopted by ten votes to none; the United States abstained.

In the days following the resolution, a de facto cessation of hostilities took place in Santo Domingo.

See also
Dominican Civil War
List of United Nations Security Council Resolutions 201 to 300 (1965–1971)
Operation Power Pack

References

External links
 
Text of the Resolution at undocs.org

 0205
1965 in the Dominican Republic
 0205
May 1965 events